Elachista crumilla is a moth of the family Elachistidae. It is found in Australia.

The wingspan is 8-10.8 mm for males and 7.8-11.8 mm for females.

References

Moths described in 2011
crumilla
Moths of Australia
Taxa named by Lauri Kaila